Somervell County is a county on the Edwards Plateau in the U.S. state of Texas. As of the 2020 census, its population was 9,205. Its county seat is Glen Rose. The county is named for Alexander Somervell, secretary of war for the Republic of Texas.

Somervell County is included in the Granbury micropolitan area.

The county contains the Comanche Peak Nuclear Generating Station, one of two nuclear power plants in Texas.

History

Native Americans

Caddo tribe Anadarko villages were scattered along Trinity and Brazos Rivers. The Caddo tribe of Wichita also inhabited the area. By 1860, these tribes had moved to Oklahoma.

The Tonkawa were hunter-gatherers of the area, and often traded with their allies the Caddo and Karankawa.  Like the Wichita, Karankawa and Jumano, the Tonkawa tattooed their bodies and faces. Some Tonkawa men were employed as scouts for the Texas Rangers and United States Army. As they were pushed out by the Comanche, they moved to the Brazos Indian Reservation, and later to Oklahoma

Comanche bands continued depredations on settlers until their removal to Oklahoma after 1875.

County established

The county was formed and organized in 1875 from Hood County. The town of Glen Rose became the county seat.

Torrey Trading Houses opened as a part of the Sam Houston peace policy to develop friendly relationships with native tribes. They bought from, and sold to, the Indians on a banking and credit system, enabling them to also recover stolen horses and human captives. The Torreys sold their business to George Barnard in 1848, who with his brother Charles  moved the Tehuacana store in Limestone County to near Comanche Peak. Juana Josefina Cavasos Barnard had been captured by Comanches as a teenager. She was daughter of Maria Josefa Cavazos, and granddaughter of Don José Narciso Cavazos Gonzalez-Hildago who in 1792 received the largest land grant in Texas. George ransomed Juana from the tribe, but his brother Charles married her in 1848.

Somervell County got its first courthouse in Glen Rose in 1882, but the courthouse and all county records burned in 1893.
The second and current courthouse was built in 1894 by architect John McCormick. The roof and clock tower were damaged in the 1902 Glen Rose tornado. County funds at the time limited the repair, which eliminated the clock tower. In 1986, work was done to restore the structure to its original design.

Glen Rose Collegiate Institute, or Glen Rose College, operated as a private, faith-based educational facility from 1889 to 1910. Educational competition from the public-school system caused enrollment to taper off until the institution was shut down.

Under the New Deal Works Progress Administration (WPA), Glen Rose built a new water and sewage system in the 1930s, as well as school buildings, a canning plant, and low-water dams.

The Comanche Peak Nuclear Power Plant went online in the mid 1970s and employs over 1,000 people.  Squaw Creek Reservoir, which provides cooling water for the power plant, also has become a popular recreation site.

Dinosaurs

The tragic Paluxy River flood in 1908 uncovered three-toed prints from the Cretaceous period, possibly Acrocanthosaurus, and were discovered by high school student George Adams in the limestone river bed. The teenager relayed the discovery to his principal, Robert McDonald. Adams later ended up selling self-manufactured fake "giant man tracks" to tourists sometime during the 1930s, sparking a debate about whether or not humans existed alongside dinosaurs. In 1934, resident Charlie Moss discovered footprints of four-toed sauropods. Resident Jim Ryals dug out the actual dinosaur prints and sold them to tourists. Paleontologist Roland T. Bird of the American Museum of Natural History in New York City spotted the Adams "giant man tracks" in a tourist shop in Gallup, New Mexico, and, while recognizing them as fakes, was still intrigued enough to travel to Somervell County to see the Glen Rose area for himself. Bird's visit resulted in a 2-year WPA project to uncover the dinosaur prints. The American Museum of Natural History, the University of Texas at Austin, the Smithsonian Institution, and several local museums retain samples of what are said to be the best-preserved tracks in the United States.

The land along the Paluxy River for Dinosaur Valley State Park was purchased by the State of Texas in 1968, and the park opened to the public in 1972.

|postal_code_type         = ZIP code
|postal_code              = 76043
|area_code                = Area code 254

Geography
It is the second-smallest county by area in Texas, larger than only Rockwall County, and slightly smaller than Camp County.

Major highways

  U.S. Highway 67
  State Highway 144

Adjacent counties
 Hood County (north)
 Johnson County (east)
 Bosque County (south)
 Erath County (west)

Demographics

Note: the US Census treats Hispanic/Latino as an ethnic category. This table excludes Latinos from the racial categories and assigns them to a separate category. Hispanics/Latinos can be of any race.

As of the census of 2000,  6,809 people, 2,438 households, and 1,840 families were residing in the county.  The population density was 36 people/sq mi (14/km2).  The  2,750 housing units had an average density of 15 per square mile (6/km2).  The racial makeup of the county was 92.19% White, 0.28% African American, 0.69% Native American, 0.26% Asian, 5.12% from other races, and 1.45% from two or more races. About 13.44% of the population were Hispanics or Latinos of any race.

Of the 2,438 households,  37.4% had children under 18 living with them, 61.7% were married couples living together, 9.6% had a female householder with no husband present, and 24.5% were not families. About 21.3% of all households were made up of individuals, and 9.2% had someone living alone who was 65 or older.  The average household size was 2.73, and the average family size was 3.17. As of the 2010 census,  about 1.3 same-sex couples per 1,000 households were in the county.

In the county, the age distribution was 28.4% under  18, 7.7% from 18 to 24, 26.8% from 25 to 44, 23.7% from 45 to 64, and 13.3% who were 65 or older.  The median age was 37 years. For every 100 females, there were 99.6 males.  For every 100 females age 18 and over, there were 95.9 males.

The median income for a household in the county was $39,404, and for a family was $46,458. Males had a median income of $32,463 versus $23,381 for females. The per capita income for the county was $18,367.  About 6.10% of families and 8.60% of the population were below the poverty line, including 10.30% of those under age 18 and 9.10% of those age 65 or over.

Media
Two newspapers have offices located in Somervell County, the Glen Rose Reporter and the Glen Rose Newspaper. The Somervell County Salon is a local blog that has video and audio of local meetings. Local television stations that provide coverage for the area broadcast from the Dallas]-Fort Worth and the Waco/Temple/Killeen (Central Texas) metropolitan areas.

Communities

City
 Glen Rose (county seat)

Unincorporated communities
 Glass
 Nemo
 Rainbow

Politics
Somervell County has voted for the Republican Party in all presidential elections since 1984, except in 1992, when it was one of the few counties nationwide to vote for the independent candidate Ross Perot who beat George H. W. Bush by a mere 42 votes.

See also

 National Register of Historic Places listings in Somervell County, Texas
 Recorded Texas Historic Landmarks in Somervell County

References

External links

 Somervell County
 
 Glen Rose Information

 
1875 establishments in Texas
Populated places established in 1875
Granbury micropolitan area